The Battalion (The Batt) is the student newspaper of Texas A&M University. Started in 1893 as a monthly publication, it continues to this day, now as a weekly paper. The first paper at Texas A&M University was the Texas Collegian published in 1878. It was later named the College Journal from 1889 to 1893 and then The Battalion.

History
The Agricultural and Mechanical College of Texas (now known as Texas A&M University), had two literary societies, the Callipean and the Austin.   The societies collaboratively published a literary magazine, College Journal from 1889 until 1893.  The College Journal appeared monthly, describing the activities of the college and its students in "the flowery prose of the time." College Journal ceased publication in 1893 when the two societies collaborated on a newspaper, called The Battalion.  This new publication used a more journalistic style as it covered campus events, and even included photographs. The paper later had weekly distribution, and then began publishing daily.  For years, the masthead included the words Lawrence Sullivan Ross – Soldier, Statesman, Knightly Gentleman.

Singer-songwriter and actor Lyle Lovett wrote for The Battalion as a journalism student.

Distribution
The Battalion is published on Thursdays during the fall and spring semesters, and on dates corresponding with New Student Conferences during the summer sessions. The print version is distributed throughout the Texas A&M campus to interested students, faculty and staff. Many places throughout College Station, such as restaurants and apartments, receive copies to distribute to their customers.

In February 2022, Texas A&M University administration unsuccessfully attempted to cease The Battalion weekly print release, despite the organization's independent status. This led to significant backlash from the publication, as featured in their "Print is not dead" edition, and started a student movement, #SaveTheBatt. The publication continues to print weekly, each Thursday, and distributes across Texas A&M's campus and the Bryan-College Station community.

Honors
Princeton Review named The Battalion as the twentieth best college newspaper in the nation in its 2008 edition of The Best 361 Colleges. Along with four other university newspapers, The Battalion received honorable mention in the 2004 National College Newspaper Convention held by the Associated Collegiate Press. The paper was named the winner of the 2008 and 2019 National Pacemaker Award. It was also a Pacemaker finalist in the 1996–97 and 1995–96 scholastic years, and won the Southwest Regional Pacemaker for the 1991–92 school year.

Current editors

See also
List of student newspapers in the United States of America
List of student newspapers

Notes

External links

List of all-time Battalion editors

Student newspapers published in Texas
Texas A&M University student organizations
Publications established in 1893
Weekly newspapers published in Texas